UNIT: Snake Head is a Big Finish Productions audio drama based on the long-running British science fiction television series Doctor Who. It continues the story of UNIT (United Nations Intelligence Taskforce). "Snake Head" is the second in a four-part mini-series.

Plot 
UNIT's new commander, Colonel Robert Dalton, and the division's political officer Colonel Emily Chaudry, investigate bizarre occurrences in Southend.

Cast
Colonel Emily Chaudhry - Siri O'Neal
Colonel Robert Dalton - Nicholas Deal
Dr Hendrick - Ian Brooker
Lieutenant Hoffman - Robert Curbishley
Kevin - Ian Hayles
Goran - Toby Longworth
Anni - Jayne MacFarlane

References

External links
Big Finish Productions - UNIT: Snake Head
Article about the production from the Southend Evening Echo

Snake Head
2005 audio plays